The Hellinikon Olympic Hockey Centre was the site of the field hockey events at the 2004 Summer Olympics in Athens. Located in the Hellinikon Olympic Complex, the facility consists of two hockey fields. The larger stadium seats 7,200 fans – though only 5,200 seats were made publicly available during the Games, and the smaller stadium seats 2,100 spectators – though only 1,200 seats were made publicly available during the Games. The facility was completed on February 29, 2004, and officially opened on August 11, 2004, shortly before the beginning of the Games.

During the 2004 Summer Paralympics, the Olympic Hockey Centre was the venue for Football 5-a-side and Football 7-a-side competitions.

The hockey centre has since fallen into disuse and disrepair. No hockey has been played at the centre since the end of the 2004 Olympic Games.

References
2004 Summer Olympics official report. Volume 2. p. 353.
Olympicproperties.gr profile. 
The 2004 Olympic Legacy

Buildings and structures completed in 2004
Venues of the 2004 Summer Olympics
Olympic field hockey venues
Defunct sports venues in Greece
Hockey
Field hockey in Greece